Gina Manès (born Blanche Moulin; 7 April 1893 – 6 September 1989) was a French film actress and a major star of French silent cinema. After an early appearance in a Louis Feuillade film, she had significant roles in films of Germaine Dulac and Jean Epstein, including Cœur fidèle.

Career

In Abel Gance's Napoléon, she took the part of Joséphine de Beauharnais, and then played the title role in Jacques Feyder's Thérèse Raquin. She made the transition to sound films but during the 1930s her popularity faded, and periods of residence in Morocco took her further from the public eye. She continued to take small roles in films, and also worked in the circus and in the theatre. In total, Manès appeared in over 90 films between 1916 and 1966.

Selected filmography
  L'Homme sans visage (1919), directed by Louis Feuillade
  L'Auberge rouge (1923), directed by Jean Epstein
  Cœur fidèle (1923), directed by Jean Epstein
  Heart of an Actress (Âme d'artiste) (1924), directed by Germaine Dulac
  Sables (1927), directed by Dimitri Kirsanoff
  Napoléon (1927), directed by Abel Gance
 Sin (1928), directed by Gustaf Molander
  The Saint and Her Fool (Die Heilige und ihr Narr) (1928), directed by William Dieterle
  Thérèse Raquin (1928), directed by Jacques Feyder
 Looping the Loop (Die Todesschleife) (1928), directed by Arthur Robison
 The Little Slave (Die kleine Sklavin) (1928), directed by Jacob Fleck and Luise Fleck
 Ship in Distress (S.O.S. Schiff in Not) (1929), directed by Carmine Gallone
 Latin Quarter (Quartier Latin) (1929), directed by Augusto Genina
 Le Train sans yeux (1929), directed by Alberto Cavalcanti
  Nights of Princes (Nuits de princes) (1930), directed by Marcel L'Herbier
 The Shark (Le Requin) (1930), directed by Henri Chomette
  Salto Mortale  (1931), directed by Ewald André Dupont
 Under the Leather Helmet (Sous le casque de cuir) (1932), directed by Albert de Courville
  A Man's Neck (La Tête d'un homme) (1933), directed by Julien Duvivier
 La Voie sans disque (1933), directed by Léon Poirier
 Divine (1935), directed by Max Ophüls
 The Devil in the Bottle (Le Diable en bouteille) (1935), directed by Raoul Ploquin
  The Mysterious Lady (La Mystérieuse Lady) (1936), directed by Robert Péguy
 Mayerling (1936), directed by Anatole Litvak
  Mollenard (1938), directed by Robert Siodmak
 Fort Dolorès (1938), directed by René Le Hénaff
 Coral Reefs ( Le Récif de corail) (1939), directed by Maurice Gleize
 Majestic Hotel Cellars (Les Caves du Majestic) (1945), directed by Richard Pottier
 The Dancer of Marrakesh (La Danseuse de Marrakech) (1949), directed by Léon Mathot
 The Count of Bragelonne (Le Vicomte de Bragelonne) (1954), directed by Fernando Cerchio
 Paris, Palace Hotel (1956), directed by Henri Verneuil
 Pity for the Vamps (Pitié pour les vamps) (1956), directed by Jean Josipovici
 A Certain Monsieur Jo (Un certain monsieur Jo) (1958), directed by René Jolivet
 First of May (Premier mai) (1958), directed by Luis Saslavsky
 Mimi Pinson (1958), directed by Robert Darène

References

External links

Photographs and bibliography

French film actresses
French silent film actresses
1893 births
1989 deaths
20th-century French actresses
Actresses from Paris